The 2002–03 Second League of Serbia and Montenegro season (Serbian: Druga Savezna Liga) consisted of four groups of 12 teams.

The competition started this season as Second League of FR Yugoslavia. The country changed name from FR Yugoslavia to Serbia and Montenegro on February 4, 2003, and the competition became the Second League of Serbia and Montenegro.

League table

North

East

West

South (Montenegro)

Second League of Serbia and Montenegro
2002–03 in Serbian football
2002–03 in Montenegrin football
Serbia